TVR Cultural is the cultural channel of Romania's government-funded television network Televiziunea Română (TVR). It provided cultural news, documentaries about the arts, as well as various shows, musicals and theatrical pieces. It was closed in September 2012 and restarted in December 2022.

History
TVR Cultural began transmission in 2002. It was modelled on the Franco-German TV channel Arte and other European channels focused on cultural and artistic programming.

Due to a financial crisis, TVR president Claudiu Săftoiu decided to end TVR Cultural broadcasts in the summer of 2012. There was widespread criticism of this decision, which came at a time when other public broadcasters in the Central and Eastern Europe, including Poland's Telewizja Polska and the Czech Republic's Česká televize, were expanding their cultural output.

TVR Cultural started rebroadcasting again in 2022, ten years after its closure, following an internal vote within TVR. On September 7, 2022, Romania's National Audiovisual Council granted a license to restart broadcasting.

On December 1, 2022, to coincide with Romania's National Day, TVR Cultural relaunched its broadcasts with the stated aim of "[creating] bridges between tradition and modernity, between conservatism and progressivism, between rural and urban, between peripheral and central." The first day of broadcasts included debates on cultural topics, interviews with Romanian cultural figures (including Daniel Jiga, the director of the Romanian National Opera), and a rebroadcast of a 1978 staging of Victor Ion Popa's play "Take, Ianke and Cadîr".

Under new TVR president Dan-Cristian Turturică, the relaunched TVR Cultural aims to bring focus to young artists from Romania and Moldova, to showcase minority cultures in Romania, to document the state of culture during Romania's communist period, and to rebroadcast archival programming alongside new concerts, plays, and other cultural events. Its regular segment, the "Cultural Journal" ("Jurnal Cultural"), hosted by Bogdan Stănescu, covers current affairs in the field of arts and culture in Romania and abroad.

Unlike its pre-2012 feed (which was available only in SD), the relaunched channel is now available in both SD and HD feeds. The SD feed is only available on digital terrestrial television in Romania at channel 5.

See also
Arte
Mezzo
TVP Kultura

References

External links
 TVR Cultural ID - Soprano & Tatoo
 TVR Cultural

Cultural
Television channels and stations established in 2002
Television channels and stations disestablished in 2012
2002 establishments in Romania
2012 disestablishments in Romania
Defunct television channels in Romania